Progress M-28M, identified by NASA as Progress 60P was a Progress spacecraft used by Roskosmos to resupply the International Space Station (ISS) during 2015. It was launched on 3 July 2015, less than a week following the failure of SpaceX CRS-7 and the previous failure of Progress M-27M to deliver cargo to the ISS. The 28th Progress-M 11F615A60 spacecraft launched has the serial number 428 and was built by RKK Energia.

Launch
The spacecraft was launched on 3 July 2015 at 04:55 UTC from the Baikonur Cosmodrome in Kazakhstan.

Docking
Progress M-28M docked with the Pirs docking compartment on 5 July 2015 at 07:11 UTC. The spacecraft undocked from the station on 19 December 2015 at 07:35 UTC.

Cargo

The Progress spacecraft carries 2381 kg of cargo and supplies to the International Space Station. The craft is delivering food, fuel and supplies, including 520 kg of propellant, 48 kg of oxygen and air, 420 kg of water, and 1393 kg of spare parts, supplies and experiment hardware for the six members of the Expedition 44 crew. Progress M-28M is scheduled to remain docked to Pirs for about four months.

See also

 2015 in spaceflight

References

External links

Progress (spacecraft) missions
Spacecraft launched in 2015
2015 in Russia
Spacecraft which reentered in 2015
Spacecraft launched by Soyuz-U rockets
Supply vehicles for the International Space Station